The 2011 Babergh Council election took place on 5 May 2011 to elect members of Babergh District Council in Suffolk, England. The whole council was up for election and the council stayed under no overall control.

Background
The previous election in 2007 saw no party win a majority, with the Conservatives being the largest party. Labour won no seats at the election, but recovered one seat when Tony Bavington gained a seat back in a 2010 by-election in Great Cornard. A further change in composition came in March 2010 when councillor Dean Walton defected to the Green Party from the Conservatives, but sat as an independent on Babergh Council.

A total of 122 candidates were nominated for the 43 seats being contested, which was reported to be a record for an election to Babergh Council, and up from 78 at the 2003 election and 87 in 2007. These were comprised on 34 Conservatives, 31 Labour, 27 Liberal Democrats, 14 United Kingdom Independence Party, 1 Green Party and 15 candidates from no party. The 31 candidates from Labour was a record for the party in Babergh, while the Liberal Democrat leader on Suffolk County Council, Kathy Pollard, was among the Liberal Democrat candidates.

Election result
The results saw the council remain under no overall control, with the Conservatives staying as the largest party on 18 seats. The Liberal Democrats dropped to 12 seats, while Labour increased from the 1 seat they had held after a by-election gain to 3 seats.

Individual results included an independent gain from the Conservatives in Lavenham, Liberal Democrat Kathy Pollard winning a place back on the council after 16 years, while author and Labour candidate Nicci Gerrard lost in South Cosford, coming third with 187 votes.

|}

2 Liberal Democrat and 1 Independent candidates were unopposed.

Ward results

References

2011 English local elections
2011
2010s in Suffolk
May 2011 events in the United Kingdom